Alberto Paulino is an Angolan politician for MPLA and a member of the National Assembly of Angola.

References

Living people
Members of the National Assembly (Angola)
MPLA politicians
Year of birth missing (living people)
Place of birth missing (living people)